Andrea Barnet is an American author.

Biography
Andrea Barnet was born in Boston, Massachusetts. She got her education at the University of Pennsylvania and then attended Harvard University. After college Barnet worked as a reviewer for The New York Times Book Review for 25 years from 1985. She also produced work for publications such as Smithsonian, Harper's Bazaar, The Toronto Globe, Avenue, and Architectural Record. She has written two books. Her second, Visionary Women, was a finalist for the 2019 PEN/ Bograd Weld Award and won The Green Prize for Sustainable Literature while the first was shortlisted for the 17th Lambda Literary Awards. She is married to artist Kit White and they have one daughter. They live in New York.

Bibliography
 Visionary Women: How Rachel Carson, Jane Jacobs, Jane Goodall and Alice Waters Changed Our World
 All-Night Party: The Women of Bohemian Greenwich Village and Harlem, 1913-1930

Sources

Living people
Writers from Boston
21st-century American women writers
University of Pennsylvania alumni
Harvard University alumni
Year of birth missing (living people)